Chinese Gung Fu: The Philosophical Art of Self-Defense is a book written by Bruce Lee expressing his martial arts philosophy and viewpoints. It describes his early style of gung fu which was based heavily on Wing Chun. This was before the development of his unique style of martial arts called Jeet Kune Do in the late 1960s.

Chinese Gung Fu: The Philosophical Art of Self-Defense was published in early 1963 by Bruce Lee with the help of friend and fellow martial artist James Yimm Lee of Oakland, California. James had previously published books on the martial arts such as Modern Gung Fu, Karate: Iron, Poison Hand Training and Karate Oriental Self-Defense in 1957. In the book Remembering the Master: Bruce Lee, James Yimm Lee and the Creation of Jeet Kune Do by Sid Campbell and Greglon Yimm Lee (James Lee's son) it is stated the initial run was 1,500 copies. The book was sold through James Lee's company Oriental Book Sales at a price of $5. In addition to the book, a companion Chinese Gung Fu instruction chart was available for $1.

Following Bruce Lee's death, his estate commissioned writer John Little to edit and publish some of Lee's writings. Little included the content of Chinese Gung Fu: The Philosophical Art of Self-Defense as well as additional 1964 writings by Bruce Lee in the book Bruce Lee, The Tao of Gung Fu: Commentaries on the Chinese Martial Arts.

See also
 Bruce Lee Library
 Bruce Lee's Fighting Method
 Tao of Jeet Kune Do
 Jeet Kune Do

References

External links 
 
Chinese Gung Fu: The Philosophical Art of Self-Defense PDF version at the Internet Archive 

Books by Bruce Lee
Martial arts books
Philosophy books